Devon Way is a pathway in Clackmannanshire, Central Scotland. It is used by for walkers, cyclists and horse riders and forms part of Route 767 on the National Cycle Network.

Route
The way's trailhead in Dollar is just downstream of the village centre on the Dollar Burn. On the east side of the burn, head over the pedestrian footbridge and walk west to the disused platforms of Dollar railway station. The route follows close to a floodplain of the River Devon. It passes under two overbridges and through a section of woodland and across a minor road. For a short section, the path runs alongside the River Devon offering good views of the King's Seat and the Ochil Hills. On the outskirts of Tillicoultry, the route passes by the prominent white Sterling Furniture factory. The trailhead in Tillicoultry is on the main road just south of the High Street, close to the site of the former Tillicoultry railway station.

It utilises the old railway, a minor road and public footpaths.

Nearby attractions

Several places of interest can be easily reached from this walk: Castle Campbell, Harviestoun Castle, Ochil Hills, and the Sterling Furniture Warehouse.

Gallery

References

Footpaths in Scotland
Clackmannanshire
Scottish coast and countryside
Tourist attractions in Scotland
Transport in Scotland
Rail trails in Scotland